Southeastern Conference Player of the Year refers to the most outstanding player for the Southeastern Conference (SEC) in a given sport for a given season.

For lists of individual sport SEC Players of the Year by year:

Southeastern Conference Baseball Player of the Year
Southeastern Conference Softball Player of the Year
Southeastern Conference Men's Basketball Player of the Year
Southeastern Conference Women's Basketball Player of the Year

Additionally, SEC players of the year in football can be found at:

Southeastern Conference football individual awards

Southeastern Conference